Arzak (also Romanized as Ārzak; also known as Azark and Azrak) is a village in Zarem Rud Rural District, Hezarjarib District, Neka County, Mazandaran Province, Iran. At the 2006 census, its population was 132, in 32 families.

References 

Populated places in Neka County